was an adult lolicon and bishōjo manga magazine published by Amatriasha from February 1982 to November 1998 in Japan. The first issue had some gravure idol photographs, but the format of the magazine quickly switched to all manga by the eighth issue.

Lemon People was one of the very first lolicon magazines, with the first issue's cover stating that it "had the monopoly on lolicon comic content in 1982". Lemon People was the longest-running lolicon manga magazine in Japan at the time, this record only being surpassed by Comic LO in the late 2010s. The magazine ran stories with genres that included science fiction, cyberpunk, space opera, fantasy, and horror. Other stories often involved humor and parody. Lemon People received competition from other magazines such as Manga Burikko, Manga Hot Milk, Melon Comic, and Monthly Halflita, though none of them achieved the same success.

Before Lemon People, adult comics tended to be more dramatic and serious. Lemon People changed the genre by introducing a more cute style of manga, often with less realistic storylines. Lemon People was considered the beginning of the "new wave" of lolicon manga. Throughout the 1980s and 1990s, there was a growing movement in Japan to censor magazines such as Lemon People because some viewed them as harmful to young people.

By the mid-1990s, the sales of Lemon People began to drop, and the magazine changed its format to the B5 paper size and reduced its cover price. However this strategy was not effective, and the November 1998 issue was the last one, ending a run of sixteen years and nine months.

Manga artists published
Many manga artists published works in Lemon People over its nearly seventeen-year run. Following is a list of some of them:

Shun Ajima
Rei Aran
Yoshitō Asari
Hideo Azuma
Moriwo Chimi
Clarissa
Dragoon
FJ-3
Fukuryū
Ryū Hariken
Toshihiro Hirano
Ken Hirukogami
Hiro Hoshiai
Narumi Kakinouchi
KAN2O
Kobayashi Shōnen
Meimu
Hikaru Nagareboshi
Fumio Nakajima (the Lolita Anime OVAs were based on his works here)
Ochazukenori
Makoto Orikura
Ruria046

Special issues
Beginning with the 29th issue of Lemon People, some special themed issues started being published infrequently, including two full color mooks for the anime series Fight! Iczer One. Here is a short list of some of them:

 (issue 29, science fiction, 15 May 1984)
 (issue 35, horror, 15 October 1984)
 (issue 40, reprint collection of full color art and stories from past issues, 15 February 1985)
Lemon People issues 61, 65, and 70 (1986–1987) are full color collections of original stories & art that deal with subjects like horror & fantasy.

Trivia
Lolita Anime, notable for being the first hentai OVA, was based on a work published in Lemon People.

References

External links

 Lemon People on the Anime News Network encyclopedia

 Kubo Shoten - Amatoria-sha Online (official site)
 A Catalogue of Lemon People レモンピープル目録

1982 establishments in Japan
1998 disestablishments in Japan
Defunct magazines published in Japan
Erotica magazines published in Japan
Men's magazines published in Japan
Magazines established in 1982
Monthly manga magazines published in Japan
Pornographic manga magazines
Magazines disestablished in 1998
Satirical magazines
Lolicon